The Ministry of Defence Public Relations Unit (PRO) in Thiruvananthapuram is the official agency under the Ministry of Defence entrusted to communicate and disseminate information about various programs, policies and activities of the Armed Forces and other organizations of the Ministry of Defence. It has its headquarters at the Directorate of Public Relations, Ministry of Defence, South Block, New Delhi.

History
Established under the Ministry of Defence, the Public Relations Unit (Defence) of Thiruvananthapuram started functioning in the year 1989 at Belhaven Palace Kowdiar. Designated by the Ministry of Defence, the head of Public Relations Unit is the Defence PRO and the Official Spokesperson for all matters concerning Defence Services. He/She disseminate and facilitate information to Media agencies. Squadron Leader S Hariharan was the first Defence PRO of the PRU (Defence) Thiruvananthapuram. From 31 Aug 2017 onwards, Smt Dhanya Sanal K, IIS is in the position of Defence PRO.

Office bearers since 1989 
1.Squadron Leader S Hariharan

2.Shri P Rajendran, IIS

3.Commander Manoharan Nambiar (Offg)

4.Shri PN Krishna Pillai, IIS

5.Shri Prakash Magdum, IIS

6.Commander Roy Francis (Offg)

7.Shri Madhu R Sekhar, IIS

8.Commander Roy Francis (Offg)

9.Shri Suresh Sreedharan, IIS

10.Smt Dhanya Sanal K, IIS

References 

Official website, Ministry of Defence, New Delhi
Official website, Indian Air Force, New Delhi
Official website, Sainik Samachar, New Delhi

External links
 Ministry of Defence,Official website
 Indian Air Force,Official Website
 Sainik Samachar,Official website

Ministry of Defence (India)